Narayan Jagadeesan (born 24 December 1995) is an Indian cricketer. He made his first-class debut for Tamil Nadu in the 2016–17 Ranji Trophy on 27 October 2016, where he won the player of the match award. He made his Twenty20 debut for Tamil Nadu in the 2016–17 Inter State Twenty-20 Tournament on 30 January 2017. He made his List A debut for Tamil Nadu in the 2016–17 Vijay Hazare Trophy on 25 February 2017.

In January 2018, he was bought by the Chennai Super Kings in the 2018 IPL auction. Jagadeesan made his IPL debut with Chennai Super Kings on 10 October 2020 against Royal Challengers Bangalore.

In January 2021, he was the leading run-scorer in the 2020–21 Syed Mushtaq Ali Trophy, with 364 runs in eight matches. In February 2021, he was Tamil Nadu's leading run-scorer in the 2020–21 Vijay Hazare Trophy, with 217 runs including a century against Punjab.

In February 2022, he was again bought by the Chennai Super Kings in the auction for the 2022 Indian Premier League tournament.

On 21 November 2022, Narayan Jagadeesan scored 277 off 147 balls for Tamil Nadu against Arunachal Pradesh at the Chinnaswamy Stadium, breaking Ali Brown's record for the highest individual score in List A cricket. Jagadeesan became the first player to score centuries in five consecutive innings in men's List A cricket. Previously, three batters had four centuries in a row – Kumar Sangakkara in 2014–15, Alviro Petersen in 2015–16 and Devdutt Padikkal in 2020–21.

On 16 December 2022, he was bought by the Kolkata Knight Riders for the 2023 Indian Premier League tournament.

References

External links
 

1995 births
Living people
Indian cricketers
Tamil Nadu cricketers
People from Coimbatore
Chennai Super Kings cricketers
Kolkata Knight Riders cricketers